Anna Zatonskih (July 17, 1978) is a Ukrainian American chess player who holds the titles International Master (IM) and Woman Grandmaster (WGM). She is a four-time U.S. women's champion, as well as a former Ukrainian women's champion.

Career
Born July 17, 1978, in Mariupol, Ukraine (then part of the Soviet Union), Zatonskih learned chess at age five from her parents, who are both strong players. Her father Vitaly is rated about 2300, while her mother is a candidate master. Anna beat her mother for the first time at age 14.

Zatonskih won many Ukrainian girls' titles in several age categories. In 1999 she was awarded the WGM title by FIDE. She won the Ukrainian Women's Championship in 2001. She represented Ukraine in two Women's Chess Olympiads, at Istanbul 2000 at Bled 2002, and in two Women's European Team Championships, Batumi 1999 (where she won a silver medal on her board) and Leon 2001.

She has played on the U.S. national team in all Women's Olympiads since 2004 and in three Women's World Team Championships. Zatonskih won the United States Women's Chess Championship in 2006, 2008, 2009 and 2011. In 2008, she defeated the defending U.S. women's champion, Irina Krush, in a playoff held with the "" format.

Personal life
Zatonskih is married to Daniel Fridman, also a chess player. They have a daughter, Sofia, and a son, Joshua.

References

External links

1978 births
Living people
Chess International Masters
Chess woman grandmasters
American female chess players
Ukrainian female chess players
Chess Olympiad competitors

Sportspeople from Mariupol
Ukrainian emigrants to the United States
21st-century American women